Jeffrey Lawal-Balogun (born 2 July 1986) is a London-based British track athlete. Balogun began his career when he joined Kent AC at the age of 19. Balogun competes across 60m 100m and 200m distances, and has represented Great Britain at U23 and Senior level. He is coached by Clarence Callender, the 1998 Olympic 4x100m Silver medallist.

Biography
Balogun lives in Mottingham, South London, and attended the University of East London, studying marketing. He was first approached to attend a training session after a Kent AC athlete saw him running to catch a bus in 2006 when he was 19. Balogun's first trial at Kent AC was overseen by Clarence Callender and Donovan Reid. Callender recalled that the first reaction that he and Reid had to Baloguns first trial run was "The next moment, when I looked up he was disappearing into the distance. He had trainers on and he'd never stretched before in his life but he just kept on running and wouldn't stop".

Balogun made his first competitive appearance in the 200 metre event at the British Athletics League National Two on May 6, 2006. He finished 2nd with a time of 22.70 seconds.

Balogun became the 12th all-time fastest British athlete over 200m when he set a time of 20.38 seconds at a meeting in La Chaux-de-Fonds, Switzerland in 2009. He was ranked 2nd in Great Britain over 200 metres in 2009, and in 2010 was ranked 10th in Great Britain over 100 metres. Balogun was awarded a scholarship from the University of East London in 2010, in recognition of his sporting achievements.

Achievements

References

External links 
 Kent Athletic Club
 UELSports
 

British male sprinters
Alumni of the University of East London
1986 births
Living people
Black British sportspeople
English people of Nigerian descent